Prince Antasari (1797 – 11 October 1862), also known by his Indonesian name Pangeran Antasari, was a sultan of Banjar and is a National Hero of Indonesia. His son Prince Hijrah is one of The Navy leader.

Biography
Antasari was born in 1797. He was son of Prince Mashud and grandson of Prince Amir. He was a prince from a line of the royal family whose power had been usurped in the 18th century.

Antasari was concerned about the coronation of Sultan Tamjid (or Tamjidillah), instead of Prince Hidayat (or Hidayatullah), as the replacement to Sultan Adam in Banjar in 1859; Tamjidillah's coronation was backed by the Dutch colonials, who were looking to sow unrest and discord to make their attempts to take over Borneo easier. As Antasari wanted to repel the Dutch, he cooperated with the leaders of Martapura, Kapuas, Pelaihari, Barito, and Kahayan. He was also aided by Hidayatullah and Demang Leman.

On 18 April 1859, the Banjarmasin War broke out between Antasari's alliance, which was able to field some 6,000 armed men, and the Dutch. The war took place mainly in South and Central Kalimantan. Antasari's forces attacked the Dutch in Gunung Jabuk and also the Dutch coal mines in Pengaron. Meanwhile, his allies attacked other Dutch posts. They also attacked Dutch ships, killing Lieutenants Van der Velde and Bangert when they sank the ship Onrust in December 1859. Antasari rejected Dutch attempts to negotiate an end to the war, in which they offered him wealth and power in exchange for his surrender.

In early August 1860, Antasari's forces were in Ringkau Katan. They were defeated in a battle on 9 August, after Dutch reinforcements had arrived from Amuntai. Hidayatullah was exiled to Java, but Antasari, who succeeded him as Sultan, together with Prince Miradipa and Tumenggung Mancanegara, defended Tundakan fort on 24 September 1861. He also defended a fort in Mount Tongka on 8 November 1861 with Gusti Umar and Tumenggung Surapati.

In October 1862, Antasari was planning a big attack. However, an outbreak of smallpox led to his death on 11 October 1862. He was buried in Banjarmasin; and several other resistance leaders, from different periods, were later buried there; the place was later named the Antasari Heroes' Cemetery. After Antasari's death, his son, Muhammad Seman, continued his struggle against the Dutch. The resistance ended with Seman's death in 1905.

His son pangeran Hijrah has 10 granddaughters with his daughters, and has 20 great granddaughters with his granddaughter.

Legacy

Antasari was given the title 'Panembahan Amiruddin Khaliful Mukmin' on 14 March 1862 by his people, which made him a religious leader for his people. He was declared a National Hero of Indonesia in 1968 by President Suharto through presidential decree No. 06/TK/1968.

In the mid-1990s a documentary on Antasari's life was made. Antasari is featured on the obverse of the 2009 series 2,000 rupiah bill, which shows traditional Bornean dancers on the reverse.

References

Bibliography

1809 births
1862 deaths
National Heroes of Indonesia
Deaths from smallpox
Indonesian revolutionaries
19th-century Indonesian people